Dabuy-ye Shomali Rural District is a rural district (dehestan) in Sorkhrud District, Mahmudabad County, Mazandaran Province, Iran. At the 2006 census, its population was 7,745, in 2,112 families. The rural district has 16 villages.

References 

Rural Districts of Mazandaran Province
Mahmudabad County